Adoor Kadampanad Diocese is one of 30 dioceses of the Malankara Orthodox Syrian Church. The diocese was created on August 15, 2010. Zacharias Aprem is the current Metropolitan. The head office is located in Mar Ephipanios center, Sreyas Aramana, Kannamkode, Adoor.

History

Adoor Kadampanad Diocese was created on 15 September 2010. H.G. Dr.Zacharias Mar Aprem serves as its first Metropolitan. The diocese was created mainly by the partition of Kollam Diocese. Some parishes of Thiruvananthapuram, Mavelikkara, Chengannur, and Thumpamon dioceses added to this diocese.

Parish list

St. Mary's Orthodox Church, Adoor
Mar Ignatious Orthodox Church, Adoor
MarthSmooni Orthodox Church, Adoor
St. Thomas Orthodox Church, Kannamkode
St. Mary's Orthodox Church, Anandappally
St. George Orthodox Church, Anandappally
St. Kuriakos Orthodox Church, Anandappally
St. Mary's Orthodox Church, Aykadu
MarthSmooni Orthodox valiyapalli, Peringanadu
St. Gregorios Orthodox Church, Peringanadu
St. Gregorios Orthodox Church, Pazhakulam
St. George Orthodox Church, Paranthal
St. Mary's Orthodox Church, Karuvatta
MarthSmooni Orthodox Church, Kottanellur
St. George Orthodox Church, Nooranad .

Parakkod
 
St. Mary's Orthodox Church, Thoduvakkad
St. Mary's Orthodox Church, Nedumon
St. George Orthodox Church, Chayalod
St. Mary's Orthodox Church, Ezhamkulam
St. Gregorios Orthodox Church, Ezhamkulam
St. Mary's Orthodox Church, Mangad
Mar Aprem Orthodox Church, Parakkod
Mar Pathros Poulos Orthodox Church, Parakkod
St.  George Orthodox Church, Mamkoottam 
.

Enathu
 
St. Kuriakos Orthodox Church, Enathu
St. Mary's Orthodox Church, Puthusseribhagam
St. George Orthodox Syrian Church, Kaithaparambu
St. Mary's Orthodox Church, Thazhethuvadakku
St. George Orthodox Church, Arattupuzha
Mar Kauma Sahada Orthodox Church, Kizhakkupuram
MarthSmooni Orthodox Church, Thempara .

Kadampanadu
 

St. Thomas Orthodox Church, Kadampanadu
St. John's Orthodox Church, Thuvayur
St. George Orthodox Church, Elampallickal
St. Mary's Orthodox Church, Thengamam
St. Mary's Orthodox Church, Kadampanadu Vadakku .

Pathanapuram
 
St. Mary's Orthodox Church, Punnala
Mar Lazarus Orthodox Church, Pathanapuram
St. Mary's Orthodox Church, Vazhathope
Salem St. Mary's Orthodox Church, Pidavoor
St. Gregorios Orthodox Church, Enchapara
St. George Orthodox Church, Kalanjoor
St. Paul's Orthodox Church, Koodal
St. Mary's Orthodox Church, Koodal
St.Jude Orthodox Church, Hermon, Makkulam
St. George Orthodox Church, Kadakkamon
St. Thomas Orthodox Church, Elamannoor
St. Mary's Orthodox Church, Maroor
Mar Gregorios Orthodox Church, Maloor
St. Mary's Orthodox Church, Chelikkuzhi .

Chapels
 
Adoor
St.Jude, Thapovan
St. Gregorios, Pannivizha
St. Mary's, Peringanad
Mar Baselios, Kottumukal .

Parakkod
 
Mar Laserus, Maruthimood .

Kadampanadu
 
Mar Gregorios, Nellimukal
St. Jude, Ezhammile .

Pathanapuram
 
St. Gregorios, Edathara
St. Gregorios, Salempuram
St. George, Kurangayam
St. Mary's, Nedumankavu
St. Stephen's (Mount Tabor Dayara), Pathanapuram
St. Gregorios, Makkulam

See also

 Saint Thomas
 Paulose II
 Mathews II

References

External links
Website of Malankara Orthodox Church

Malankara Orthodox Syrian Church dioceses
2010 establishments in Kerala